"Coca Cola Tu" is a Hindi single by Tony Kakkar featuring Young Desi.

Music video 
The original music video was removed from YouTube after hitting 170 million views. On 18 September 2018 Desi Music Factory re-uploaded the music video. As of 16 May 2019 it has over 43 million views.

Personnel 
Singer – Tony Kakkar
Rap – Young Desi
Lyrics – Tony Kakkar
Music – Tony Kakkar
Label – Desi Music Factory

Remake for Luka Chuppi

Background 
The song was recreated by Tanishk Bagchi for the film Luka Chuppi with female voice by Neha Kakkar.

Reception 
The song was appreciated and the music video of the song has over 570 million views as of 19 April 2021.

References 

2019 songs
Indian songs
Hindi songs
Neha Kakkar songs
Tony Kakkar songs
Hindi film songs